Župica Lake is an artificial lake of Bosnia and Herzegovina on the Unac River. The Unac River rises beneath Šator mountain, flows through the municipality of Drvar and finally meets Una River in Martin Brod. It's dammed to form small Prekajsko Lake and a few kilometers downstream larger Župica Lake, before it reach town of Drvar in the municipality of Drvar.

The lake is located upstream from Drvar. Župica Dam is 24.75 metres high, with a curtain length of 692 metres and a surface volume of 127,777 square metres.

See also
List of lakes in Bosnia and Herzegovina

References

Lakes of Bosnia and Herzegovina
Dams in Bosnia and Herzegovina